Wanzhou railway station is the western terminus of the Yichang–Wanzhou railway in Wanzhou District, Chongqing. This is a branch off the Shanghai–Wuhan–Chengdu High-Speed Railway, with most services divert south to Chongqing on the Yuli Railway at Lichuan. High-speed rail services are available to eastern destinations in neighbouring Hebei province and beyond. Major destinations being Wuhan and Yichang. Conventional rail connections extend to the west, to Dazhou and beyond to Chengdu and other Sichuan cities via the Dacheng Railway and Chongqing via the Xiangyu Railway. The station was opened to high-speed traffic on December 22, 2010.

References

Rail transport in Chongqing
Railway stations in China opened in 2004
Railway stations in Chongqing